The Haradnichanka, Haradnitsa (Gorodnichanka) is a river in Grodno and Grodno District, Belarus.

The headwaters of the Haradnichanka river are in the Kulbaki village to the north-west of Grodno, Belarus.

The river has one tributary - the Yurysdyka stream.

The river roughly follows the edge of the glaciation during the last ice age.

The Haradnichanka river enters the Neman River near the Orthodox church of Sts. Boris and Gleb Kolozha and the Old Grodno Castle

Grodno
Rivers of Grodno Region
Rivers of Belarus